The Little Cannon River is a  river of Minnesota in the United States. It flows into the Cannon River at the city of Cannon Falls.  A section of the Little Cannon River south of Sogn, Minnesota is a designated trout stream by the Minnesota Department of Natural Resources.

Description

The Cannon River and Little Cannon River names came from a mispronunciation of the original French explorers name for the river, "Canot".

There was a dam on the Little Cannon River in Goodhue County.  The ruins of the Archibald Mill dam are located on the Little Cannon River.  The dam was removed in 2001.

There is a cemetery in called the Little Cannon Cemetery north of Kenyon, Minnesota.

The Little Cannon River is a state designated canoe stream.

The Minnesota Department of Natural Resources stocks the Little Cannon River with brown and rainbow trout.

See also
List of rivers of Minnesota
List of longest streams of Minnesota

References

External links
Minnesota Watersheds
 Little Cannon River

Rivers of Minnesota
Rivers of Goodhue County, Minnesota
Southern Minnesota trout streams